Gustav Philipp Zwinger (3 January 1779 – 15 January 1819), painter and etcher, was born at Nuremberg. He was the son and pupil of the painter and engraver Sigmund Zwinger (1744—1813), now chiefly remembered as a teacher. Gustav completed his studies under Heinrich Füger in Vienna, and returning to his native town, became in turn professor and director of the Art School. He was also known as an historical painter, both in oil and watercolour, and as a designer of book illustrations. He etched a few plates and tried his hand at lithography. He died at Nuremberg.

References

1779 births
1819 deaths
18th-century German painters
18th-century German male artists
German male painters
19th-century German painters
19th-century German male artists
German printmakers
Artists from Nuremberg
19th-century painters of historical subjects